Domonkos Ferjancsik (born 7 September 1975) is a Hungarian fencer. He competed in the individual and team sabre events at the 2000 and 2004 Summer Olympics. He won a silver and bronze medal at the 2003 World Fencing Championships and a gold medal at the 1998 World Fencing Championships.

References

External links
 

1975 births
Living people
Hungarian male sabre fencers
Olympic fencers of Hungary
Fencers at the 2000 Summer Olympics
Fencers at the 2004 Summer Olympics
Martial artists from Budapest